Athanasius III Patellarios (born Alexios Patellarios, ; 1597 – 5 April 1654) was the Patriarch of Constantinople in 1634, 1635 and 1652. Before his patriarchate Athanasius was metropolitan of Thessaloniki. He participated at Patriarch Nikon's book editing reforms in 1653.

Athanasius was canonized as an Enlightener into the Synaxis of Athonite Venerables by the Russian Church in the 1670s. His feast date is on 2 (15) May, on the 2nd Week after Pentecost, canonized alongside Athanasius the Great.

Biography 
Alexios was born to a noble family with roots dating back to the Paleologos Dynasty. His father Georgios was a scientist and publisher, and his elder brother Eustaphios was a physician. For 26 years he lived in Crete in the Arkadi Monastery, which was then under Venetian rule, and received there his education. Alexios knew well philosophy, Ancient Greek, Latin, Hebrew, Arab and Italian language.

In 1631, Alexios was consecrated as metropolitan of Thessaloniki; he was under patronage of Patriarch Cyril Lucaris. In early 1634, a third opposition against Lucaris regarding the publication of Eastern Confession of the Christian faith on March 1629 was formed in Fanari, as the document had Calvinist theological lines. In February 1634, Athanasius became Patriarch of Constantinople and was enthroned on 25 March.

After several days he was dethroned by Cyril Lucaris, who returned from prison. Athanasius then escaped to the Athos, where he built the skete (where in 1849 the Russian St. Andrew skete was founded), which kept the icon Consolation in Sorrow and Grief (В скорбех и печалех Утешение).

After his second deposition in 1635, Athanasius went to Italy, staying in Ancona and Venice. Peter Rietbergen relates, "Landing in Ancona, he was received by the famous Orientalist scholar Father Orazio Giustiniani. After having reached Rome, he swore fealty to the pope. Consequently, he was given support in manpower and money before returning to Istanbul." He "declared [himself] for Rome", says Steven Runciman. The Pope of Rome advised Athanasius to become cardinal and accept the Credo with the Filioque, but the saint declined.

In 1637, Athanasius was called to Constantinople. On 26 June 1638, after Lucaris was strangled by the request of Murad IV, Athanasius became a pretender to the patriarchate. Parthenius of Constantinople, Patriarch from 1639 to 1644, required Athanasius to renounce from the patriarchate and return to the Thessaloniki cathedra. Because of the metropolis' taxes, Athanasius was imprisoned twice, and asked the Russian Tsar Michael I for charity.

In 1643, he moved to Russia, but on the way there became ill and stayed in Moldavia, by the hospodar Vasily Lupu. In Galaţi he founded the St. Nicholas Monastery as a metochion of the St. Catherine's Monastery in Sinai. At that time he wrote the "Hymn to the Mother of God", and an encomium to Lupu.

Athanasius returned to Constantinople in 1652 and took the patriarchate for the third time. Again holding the throne for a short time, Athanasius in July 1652 voluntarily renounced from the patriarchate and ad infinitum left Constantinople. During his last patriarchate, he spoke out a sermon mentioning his dissociation with Catholicism. He again went to Moldavia visiting Lupu in Iaşi, then to Chigirin visiting Bohdan Khmelnytsky. With the deeds of those people for the Tsar he reached Moscow on 16 April 1653, and on 22 April visited Tsar Alexey.

There he lived at the Kirillov metochion, and made his divine service at the Novospassky Monastery and at the Saviour Cathedral by the Terem Palace. In July 1653 Athanasius visited the Trinity Sergiev Monastery.

At the request of Patriarch Nikon, Athanasius wrote The Ordo of the Episcopal Liturgy in the East, which underlined the Muscovian edited Archieratikon of the Episcopal Service, which is used by the Russian Church to date. Athanasius delivered the Tsar a notebook in which he stated his main reason for his visit to Moscow; that is, to arouse the Tsar unite with Moldavia and the Cossack Hetmanate for a future war with the Turks, after which the Tsar should become the new Roman Emperor, and the Moscow Patriarch – the new Ecumenical Patriarch.

Athanasius is known as a trader of indulgences, which he sold in large quantities in Ukraine and Russia. 

By December 1653, Athanasius moved to Moldavia for the Nicholas Monastery in Galaţi. En route, he made a visit to Bohdan Khmelnytsky. In February 1654, he stayed at the Mhar Monastery near Lubensk and died on 5 April on Thomas' Week. He was buried by the hegumen of the Transfiguration monastery, his body was in a sitting position on the throne under the ambon.

Veneration 

On 1 February 1662, the saint's relics were translated due to  the metropolitan of Gaza Paisios Ligaridis, who, visiting Lubensk Monastery, had a vision of Athanasius during his sleep.
In 1672, the Tsar requested podyachy M. Savin to investigate the wonders from the relics. In the 18th century, manuscripts of his hagiography and canon were preserved at the Lubensk Monastery.

In 1818, Methodius (Pishnyachevsky), bishop of Poltava, applied the Most Holy Synod for the canonization of Athanasius, but the application was declined. However the saint's honouring and recorded wonders from his relics continued. In the 1860s, church historian Andrey Nikolayevich Muravyov created a new hagiography of Athanasius with examples of wonders at his relics.

The history of the canonization of Athanasius is vague, but the official honouring began in the Russian Church by the end of the 19th century, although Yevgeny Golubinsky through his works proved that the honouring started between 1672 and 1676 under Joseph (Nelyubovich-Tukalsky), metropolitan of Kiev (Constantinople Orthodox Church).

In 1922, the Transfiguration cathedral, including the saint's silver throne, was plundered by the Bolsheviks. The relics were moved to Kharkov in the 1930s. They were eventually preserved in the city's Annunciation Cathedral in 1947.

References

Further reading 
 A. V. Ryndina, V. Shapran Athanasius III Patellarios // The Orthodox Encyclopedia. vol. IV – Moscow, 2002. — pp. 20 – 22.
 St. Athanasius, Patriarch of Tsargrad, Wonderworker of Lubensk // Journal of the Moscow Patriarchate. 1947, No. 10.

External links 
 Englightener Athanasius III Patellarios, Patriarch of Tsargrad on pravoslavie.ru
 Englightener Athanasius, Wonderworker of Lubensk. Short hagiography on the Poltava Missionary Spiritual Seminary of the UOC

Russian saints of the Eastern Orthodox Church
17th-century Christian saints
17th-century Ecumenical Patriarchs of Constantinople